Copag is a company based in São Paulo, Brazil. It started as a printing company in 1908. The company expanded to making playing cards for poker and bridge in 1918. Plastic playing cards with a PVC finish are their primary product. With the recent poker boom, Copag's business has quickly grown. In 2005, the World Series of Poker slated Copag as their official playing card supplier. That same year, Copag became part of the Cartamundi Group.

External links
Official site (in Portuguese, English, and Spanish)

References

Playing card manufacturers
Manufacturing companies established in 1908
1908 establishments in Brazil
Card game publishing companies
Brazilian brands